The Idaho Transportation Department (ITD) is responsible for the establishment and classification of a state highway network, including  of roads that are classified as Interstate Highways, U.S. Highways, and state highways within the state of Idaho in the United States. The current state highway marker consists of a white background, black numbering, and a solid black geographic outline of the state of Idaho.

History

During the 1920s, in lieu of numbering its highways, Idaho had a system of lettered Sampson Trails. They were marked by businessman Charles B. Sampson of Boise at no expense to the state, using orange-colored shields. By 1929, the trails system had included  of marked highways that covered most of the state. By the mid-1930s, the state had adopted a more standard system of numbered state highways.

In 1978, the ITD began using brown state highway markers to denote scenic Idaho highways, in addition to the main highway markers that featured a black background and white lettering and the name "IDAHO" in black lettering inside a white geographic outline of the state. The brown markers were discontinued around 2012, and in April 2020, ITD changed the coloring of the main state highway marker to its current color scheme, also adding a wide version of the marker for three-digit highways and removing the word "IDAHO" from all markers in the process.

Sampson Trails
The following Sampson Trails were marked:
 A, Boise to Wyoming via Twin Falls and Pocatello; became US-30 and US-30N
 B, Boise to Canada via Lewiston and Coeur d'Alene; became US-30, US-30N, US-95, and SH-1
 C, Pocatello to Montana via Idaho Falls; became US-91 and US-191
 D, Boise to New Meadows via Banks; became SH-15 (today's SH-55)
 E, not on the 1926 map
 F, Boise to Blackfoot via Stanley; became SH-21, SH-17, US-93 (today's SH-75), and SH-27
 G, Mountain Home to Picabo via Fairfield; became SH-22 (today's US-20)
 H, Bliss to Trude via Arco; became SH-24, SH-23, SH-22, SH-29, and an unnumbered road (today's US-20 and US-26)
 I, Pioneer to Idaho Falls; became an unnumbered road
 J, Nevada to Shoshone via Twin Falls; became US-93
 K, Utah to McCammon via Preston; became US-91
 L, not on the 1926 map
 M, Washington to Montana via Coeur d'Alene; became US-10
 N, Bonners Ferry to Montana; became US-2
 O, Oregon to Caldwell; became SH-49 and SH-18
 P, Utah to Downey; became SH-36
 Q, Declo to Fairfield; became SH-25 and SH-46
 R, not on the 1926 map
 S, Oregon to Nampa; became unnumbered road and SH-45
 T, Star to Grimes Pass; became SH-16, unnumbered road, and SH-17
 U, Utah to Montpelier; became SH-35
 V, Hailey to Stanley; became US-93 (today's SH-75)
 W, not on the 1926 map
 X, not on the 1926 map
 Y, Bonners Ferry to Canada; became US-95

State highways

See also

 List of Interstate Highways in Idaho
 List of U.S. Highways in Idaho

References

External links

 Idaho Transportation Department
 Road Signs of Idaho (archived April 27, 2004)
 Pend Oreille Scenic Byway

 
State Highways